The Iron Claw is an upcoming sport biographical film written and directed by Sean Durkin and produced and distributed by A24. It is based on the life of professional wrestler Kevin Von Erich and the Von Erich family, and stars Zac Efron with an ensemble cast including Lily James, Harris Dickinson, Maura Tierney, and Holt McCallany, amongst others.

Synopsis
The film is centered around the Von Erich family, a dynasty of wrestlers from the 1960s onwards that had enormous success, and popularized the iron claw professional wrestling hold. However, they not only had to battle inside the ring, but fight the “Von Erich curse” outside of it.

Cast
Zac Efron as Kevin Von Erich
Lily James as Pam Adkisson
Harris Dickinson as David Von Erich
Maura Tierney as Doris Von Erich
Holt McCallany as Fritz Von Erich
Jeremy Allen White as Kerry Von Erich 
Stanley Simons as Mike Von Erich
Maxwell Jacob Friedman as Lance Von Erich
Brady Pierce as Michael Hayes
Aaron Dean Eisenberg as Ric Flair
Kevin Anton as Harley Race
Cazzey Louis Cereghino as Bruiser Brody
Chavo Guerrero Jr. as The Sheik
Ryan Nemeth as Gino Hernandez

Production
In June 2022, the Sean Durkin project was announced to have Zac Efron aboard and A24 financing it, after the film was developed by House Productions, with the support of Access Entertainment, and BBC Film. In September 2022, Jeremy Allen White and Harris Dickinson were announced as joining the project with White, Dickinson and Efron to play the Von Erich brothers. Tessa Ross, Derrin Schlesinger and Harrison Huffman were announced as producers. In October 2022, Holt McCallany, Maura Tierney, and Lily James were revealed to have joined the project. Juliette Howell, and Angus Lamont were said to be producing for House Productions.

The film began principal photography in Baton Rouge in October 2022. Marshall Von Erich said he was encouraged by the presence of Chavo Guerrero as wrestling consultant on set in terms of the production trying to portray accuracy.

Release
In November 2022 the film was slated to have a 2023 release date.

References

External links

2020s biographical films
21st-century biographical films
A24 (company) films
American biographical drama films
BBC Film films
British biographical drama films
Biographical films about sportspeople
Films shot in Louisiana
Films set in the 1970s
Professional wrestling films
Upcoming films